Thabo Benett Nthethe (born 3 October 1984 in Bloemfontein) is a retired South African football defender. He represented South Africa and played for Mamelodi Sundowns and was the captain of Bloemfontein Celtic.

International career

International goals
Scores and results list South Africa's goal tally first.

References

1984 births
Living people
Soccer players from the Free State (province)
Sportspeople from Bloemfontein
South African soccer players
Association football defenders
South Africa international soccer players
Bloemfontein Celtic F.C. players
Mamelodi Sundowns F.C. players
Chippa United F.C. players
TS Galaxy F.C. players
South African Premier Division players
2013 Africa Cup of Nations players
South Africa A' international soccer players
2014 African Nations Championship players